Lt. Sheikh Jamal Dhanmondi Club, nicknamed Yellow Fear, is a  multi-sports club based in the Dhanmondi area, Dhaka, Bangladesh. The club competes in the Bangladesh Premier League, the top-flight of football in Bangladesh. It was known as Dhanmondi Club before adding the founder's name after turning into a limited company. Lt. Sheikh Jamal Dhanmondi Club is one of the most successful football clubs in Bangladesh.

History
Dhanmondi Club took control of its current ground in Dhanmondi since 1962 when it was established. In 2004, the President of Dhanmondi Club and vice-president of Bangladesh Football Federation, Khairul Anwar Piaru was shot dead inside the club premises. In 2007, a court in Dhaka sentenced five people to death for his murder. In 2009, Dhanmondi Club was renamed to Lt. Sheikh Jamal Dhanmondi Club after Sheikh Jamal, the brother of Prime Minister Sheikh Hasina. Its  occupation of the playground has been protested by Bangladesh Poribesh Abndolon, Bangladesh Environmental Lawyers Association, and Institute of Architects, Bangladesh. Sheikh Jamal promised to play quality football when called up for the Bangladesh Football Premier League in 2010–11 season over two other clubs playing in the Dhaka Second Division League.
The club was champion of the 2010–11 Bangladesh League.

Shirt sponsors

Stadium
Lt. Sheikh Jamal Dhanmondi Club wanted to use Faridpur Stadium as a their home Stadium for the 2018–19 Bangladesh Premier League
however they had to play all of their matches at the Bangabandhu National Stadium which is in the Motijheel area in the heart of the city. The stadium had a capacity of close to 55,000 before the work of renovation, making it then the largest stadium of the country. After the renovation, it still remains the largest stadium of the country.

Current squad

Sheikh Jamal DC Squad for 2022–23 season.

Coaching staff
As of 20 December 2022

Coaches
  Zoran Kraljevic (17 September 2010 – 28 December 2010)
  Pakir Ali (18 January 2011 – 2011)
  Saiful Bari Titu (15 August 2011 – February 2012)
  Mohammad Abu Yousuf (17 February 2012 – 2012)
  Joseph Afusi (2012 – 28 May 2014)
  Omar Sisse^ (25 May 2013 – June 2013)
  Maruful Haque (14 June 2014 – 27 May 2015)
  Joseph Afusi (20 June 2015 – )
  Shafiqul Islam Manik (9 February – 19 July 2016)
  Stefan Hansson (19 September 2016 – 2016)
  Joshimuddin Joshi (2016)
  Joseph Afusi (12 April 2017 – 14 November 2017)
  Mahabub Hossain Roksy (15 November 2017 – 5 February 2018)
  Joseph Afusi (7 May 2018 – 18 April 2019)
  Shafiqul Islam Manik (2 May 2019 – 9 August 2021)
  Mosharraf Hossain Badal (9 August 2021 – 27 August 2021)
  Juan Manuel Martínez Sáez (November 2021 – 9 April 2022)
  Joseph Afusi (10 April 2021 –10 October 2022)
  Maruful Haque (14 October 2022– Present)

Football Committee Chairman 
Ashraf Uddin Ahmed Chunnu

Notable Players
 The players below had senior international cap(s) for their respective countries. Players whose name is listed, represented their countries before or after playing for Sheikh Jamal Dhanmondi Club.

Africa
 Emmanuel Ariwachukwu (2012–2013)
 Pa Omar Jobe (2017–2022)
 Ebou Kanteh (2018–2019)

North America 
 Sony Norde (2013–2014)
 Wedson Anselme (2013–2016)
 Cornelius Stewart (2022–)

Team records

Head coach's record

AFC club ranking

Honours

Winners
  Bangladesh Premier League (3)
2010–11, 2013–14, 2014–15
  Federation Cup (3)
2011–12, 2013–14, 2014–15
  Budha Subba Gold Cup
2002
  Pokhara Cup
2011
  Kings Cup
2014

Runners-up
  Bangladesh Premier League (2)
2012–13, 2020–21
  Federation Cup (2)
2010–11, 2012–13
  Independence Cup (1)
2012–13
  IFA Shield
2014

Performance in AFC competitions
Sheikh Jamal Dhanmondi Club have qualified for continental competition on two occasions.

2012 AFC President's Cup
The first was in 2012 when they qualified for the third-tier AFC President's Cup. However, before the tournament started they withdrew, citing security concern of playing in Pakistan.

2016 AFC Cup
Four years later, having won the 2013–14 Bangladesh Football Premier League, they qualified for the 2016 AFC Cup. In the qualifying round, they were drawn in Group A along with hosts Alga Bishkek from Kyrgyzstan and Benfica de Macau. They beat Benfica de Macau 4–1 in their opening game and then drew with hosts Alga to qualify for the group stage without having to go through the playoff round due to a lack of teams in the east region. They were drawn against Tampines Rovers from Singapore, Ceres from the Philippines and Selangor from Malaysia.

Club records

 Transfer Record (paid): $175k to air force for Solomon King Kanform in 2017
 $75 thousand to Sheikh Russel KC for Sony Norde in 2013.
 Local Highest Transfer Record : Monthly 350,000 Tk to Jamal Bhuyan for 2014–15 season.

Notes

References

Sport in Dhaka
Dhanmondi
Football clubs in Bangladesh